Resonate relates to the phenomenon of resonance.

Resonate may also refer to:

 Resonate, an album by Sonicflood
 Resonate (album), a 2016 album by Glenn Hughes
 Resonate (company), a technology company
 Resonate (festival), an annual festival for art and digital culture in Belgrade, Serbia
 Resonate Broadcasting, an Australian media company
 Resonate Group, a British software, technology and services company 
 Resonate Magazine, published by the Australian Music Centre